Para table tennis at the 2017 ASEAN Para Games were held from 17 to 23 September 2017 at Malaysian International Trade & Exhibition Centre, Kuala Lumpur.

Medal tally

Medalists

Men

Women

See also
Table tennis at the 2017 Southeast Asian Games

External links
 Official results of table tennis at the 2017 ASEAN Para Games

2017 ASEAN Para Games
Table tennis at the ASEAN Para Games
ASEAN Para Games